The Victoria Rugby Club, popularly known as the Winnipeg Victorias, was a Canadian football team in Winnipeg, Manitoba that played in the Manitoba Rugby Football Union and Western Canada Rugby Football Union between 1915 and 1935. The Winnipeg Victorias formed in the summer of 1915 when they took over the Winnipeg Rowing Club football team. The Victorias were a new team, as the Rowing Club continued to operate, naturally, as a rowing club. Prior the 1915 season the Victorias announced that they would not have a senior team, but did have teams at the intermediate, junior and juvenile levels. In 1924 they were first Winnipeg team to qualify for the Grey Cup. "An internal disagreement over which railway to use ended up costing the team the right to play. The Victorias chose to suspend operations (in 1928) rather than join the new Tri-City Football League. Concern over travel expenses was the reason." 

The Winnipeg Victorias Rugby Club was a very successful team, having won six MRFU championships and one WCRFU Championship in the 10 seasons they played.

While the Winnipeg Victorias did disband in 1935 and several of their players (including Ches McCance) were acquired by the new Winnipeg Rugby Football Club in 1935, the team is not part of the official history or records of Winnipeg's current team: the Blue Bombers.

Notable players
Ches McCance - 1935 (CFL Hall of Famer)

MRFU season-by-season

References

Defunct Canadian football teams
Canadian football teams in Winnipeg
Sports clubs established in 1915
Sports clubs disestablished in 1935
1915 establishments in Manitoba
1935 disestablishments in Canada